Bergen Light Rail is a light rail system in Bergen, Norway. The first stage of the project was a twenty-station stretch between the city center and Lagunen Storsenter, where the first 15 stations comprising a  stretch opened in 2010, and the second was a  stretch from Nesttun to Lagunen which opened in June 2013. A third stretch from Lagunen to Bergen Airport, Flesland opened in 2017. The second line between Kaigaten and Fyllingsdalen opened on 21 November 2022. Further plans for the project involve mooted extensions to Åsane and Storavatnet.

Plans for rail transit have existed since the 1970s, following the 1965 closing of the Bergen Tramway. A rapid transit design was first discarded, and in the 1990s a light rail line was proposed. The decision to start construction was made in 2005. The first stage was built by the municipality, with financing from the state and the toll road ring, based on the Bergen Program. Ownership, maintenance and further extensions and vehicles are the responsibility of Hordaland County Municipality through its wholly owned subsidiary Bybanen AS. Operation is governed by public service obligation contracts issued by the county public transport authority Skyss. From 2010 to 2017 the line and its 20 Variobahn trams were operated by Keolis Norge (formerly Fjord1 Partner).

History

Background
The first public transport in Bergen was the Bergen Tramway, which operated between 1897 and 1965. It was limited to the inner parts of the city and did not reach the suburbs. The city council therefore decided to close it, arguing that the future lay in private cars, diesel buses and trolleybuses. In the 1960s, the removal on restriction on car sales created more traffic than the roads could handle and consequently both buses and cars began increasingly being stuck in rush-hour queues. The municipality and the Norwegian Public Roads Administration started looking at rectifying the situation by building a ring road around the city, and by alternative means of public transport.

Prior to the shortening of the main Bergen Line railway with the Ulriken Tunnel, the Bergen–Nesttun Line was an important commuter rail service, feeding suburban residents from Fana into the city center. In 1917, the section was the most heavily trafficked railway in the country, with a travel time between 20 and 27 minutes. There were up to 27 trains per day, of which five continued to Garnes. In 1918, the line was proposed for doubling and electrification: the latter was completed in 1954. The same year, annual ridership were down to 870,000 passengers. After the opening of the Ulriken Tunnel commuter trains were kept for six months, with the last trip ran on 31 January 1965.

During the 1970s, plans had existed for an extensive rapid transit system, with an underground section in the city center. Inspired by the successful Oslo Metro that had opened in 1966, similar plans were developed. The proposed network was close to the current long-term plans for the light rail system, and consisted of three branches from the city center to Flaktveit, Olsvik and the airport. Four-car trains would operate at ten-minute headways. The suggestion was discussed by the city council in 1973, but no decision was taken. As an alternative, expansion of the railway from Bergen to Eidsvåg, Åsane and Nesttun was proposed. Fast commuter trains could then be supplemented with buses.

During the 1980s and 1990s, a toll ring was constructed around Bergen to finance a massive investment in motorways.  This included European Route E39 north and south of the center, the road to the airport, and west to Loddefjord and Storavatnet. Bridges were constructed to Lindås, Askøy and Sotra, and large parking garages were built in the city center. Despite this congestion continued, and it was no better in the 2000s than in the 1970s. Proposals to build bus lanes and traffic signal preemption was disregarded by the Public Roads Administration.

In 1995, the municipal bus company Bergen Sporvei made a proposal to establish what they called the Lightning Tram, from Varden in Fyllingsdalen via a tunnel to Møhlenpris and the city center, then make a 120° turn and return along the route of the Bergen trolleybus to Birkelundstoppen. The same year, the Norwegian Society for the Conservation of Nature proposed a more extensive system, the Environmental Tram, which more closely resembles the current proposals. From the city center, it would run northwards via Åsane to Flaktveit and southwards via Rådal to the airport (not via Nesttun). The southern section would have branches from Hop to Nesttun and Midttun, and from Minde westwards to Fyllingsdalen and Loddefjord. Later, Bergen Sporvei's successor, Gaia Trafikk, proposed building a bus rapid transit.

Political process
The plans launched by the city administration most closely resembled the Environmental Tram, with slight changes. The initial plans involved a line from the city center via Nesttun to the airport at Flesland. It became part of a political compromise, the Bergen Program, which ensured a number of road investments at the same time as the light rail system, all financed through the toll ring. However, a lack of funds made it necessary to build the line to Nesttun only, instead of all the way to the airport. The initial decision was taken by Bergen City Council on 13 March 2000, in the Parliament of Norway in 2002, and with the financing secured, by the city council in 2005. Only the Progress Party and the Pensioners' Party voted against light rail. Forty per cent is financed by the state, the remainder by the county, the municipality and through the toll ring.

The arguments for light rail were mainly related to the environment, urban development and reduction in road congestion. Light rail is estimated to increase the use of public transport from Fana, reducing both local and global pollution. The roads do not have capacity for further growth, and any increase in public transport would need to be taken along the light rail routes on buses—this would give higher operating costs for public transport or higher investment costs for roads. Around the stations, high-density commercial and residential centers can be established. Opponents of the project argued that it is unfair that public transport be funded by car drivers through toll roads. Protests from people in northern and western areas of the city have risen, since they are paying for the system but will not receive the benefits. For people living south of Nesttun, this will give a longer travel time to the city center than with direct buses that do not make intermediate stops.

The naming of the stations caused local debate. A draft for names were made by the municipal administration and then sent to the borough councils in Fana, Årstad and Bergenhus. Four names were changed: Nonneseteren from Jernbanen, Florida from Strømmen, Brann stadion from Nymark and Hop from Troldhaugen. Brann stadion and Troldhaugen were afterwards considered by the municipal administration, because they could be in violation of the Place Name Act. The general rule is to use the place name where the station is located, and naming after institutions or facilities nearby is not permitted unless they are in the immediate vicinity. Brann stadion, named for the football venue, was declared a borderline case, but within the rules, while Troldhaugen was not permitted because the area is not in the vicinity of the station.

Construction

Initial works commenced in August 2007, when Pastasentralen was demolished to make room for a temporary bus terminal that would allow Kaigaten to be closed for construction. Contracts for building the line were awarded to Svein Boasson, NCC Construction, Fyllingen Maskinstasjon and Veidekke Entreprenør. The contract for laying the tracks was awarded to Baneservice.

Construction started in January 2008. To pass over Strømmen, a fourth Nygård Bridge was built for cars, and the oldest was upgraded and used by the light rail line. In several places the road needed to be dug up to remove pipes and cables. In November 2009, Gulating Court of Appeal ruled that the power company BKK had to pay 80 million NOK for the moving of power lines, and could not charge the costs to the project. By June 2008, the first tracks had been laid.

Four companies bid for the initial public service obligation to operate the line: Fjord1 Partner, Norges Statsbaner, Tide Bane and Veolia Transport Norge. On 3 April 2009, the public transport agency Skyss announced that Fjord1 Partner, a joint venture between Fjord1 AS and Keolis, had won the tender competition. Fjord1 Partner received 324 applications for their 26 jobs as drivers and 10 jobs as traffic controllers. In 2014 Fjord1 AS sold their shares in Fjord1 Partner to Keolis, and the company changed its name to Keolis Norge AS.

Along with the establishment of the light rail service, the public transport in Bergen underwent other changes. Skyss was established in 2007 to administer the public transport system, manage routes and market public transport, which would be operated by private companies based on public service obligations. At the same time, a new electronic ticketing system was introduced.

Because of delays from Stadler's subcontractors, five instead of eight trams were available when the line opened on 22 June 2010. Skyss had planned to operate with a ten-minute headway until August, but had a 15-minute headway until 16 August. To compensate, none of the parallel bus routes ceased until then. On 7 June, two trams collided at low speed at Byparken, causing a derailment and forced the two trams to be repaired. This caused the summer schedule to be reduced to a 30-minute headway. From 1 November, the line started running every six minutes during the rush hour. On 22 June, the first part of the line was officially opened by Queen Sonja of Norway.

Route

The northernmost part of the line, Byparken Terminal, is a transit mall at the heart of the city center and has interchange with all buses serving the city center. The line runs south along Kaigaten, with Nonneseter stop serving the railway station and Bystasjonen serving the bus station. Southwards, the line runs in a grass right-of-way through Nygård and Florida, serving the campus of the University of Bergen. The line passes over Nygård Bridge before coming to Danmarks plass, the only island platform on the system. In this area, the track is on maize, a type of surface that allows emergency vehicles to drive safely, but makes the surface look unsafe for cars.

The line passes the depot at Kronstad before reaching Kronstad stop, almost at the door of the Bergen University College. From here, the line follows Inndalsveien, where Brann Stadion stop serves the Brann Stadion football venue. The next stops are Sletten, Slettebakken and Fantoft, the later serving a large complex of student dormitories. Southwards is the  Fantoft Tunnel, followed by Paradis stop. The line continues along the Nesttunvannet inlet to Hop, along the former right-of-way of Bergen's first motorway. Nesttun Terminal was the terminus until the extension to Lagunen was finished.

After the completion to Nesttun, the line was extended southwards to Rådal at Lagunen Storsenter. Construction began in January 2011, on its own right-of-way parallel to the existing road;, the track was completed in October 2012. The first test run to Lagunen was conducted on 6 December 2012, and the line was opened to the public on 22 June 2013.

The light rail is now connected from Lagunen via Kokstad to Bergen Airport, Flesland. Both Sørås and Indre Steinsvik have experienced rapid housing construction without a corresponding increase of public transport. Further out is a large corporate center with many of Bergen's largest employers, such as Telenor, Equinor and BKK. The area was built without sufficient roads or public transport, and has among the worst road congestion in the urban area. Building the light rail line to Flesland supplements the airport shuttles and offer cheaper service for locals and employees at the airport. Another incentive to build to Flesland was that there was sufficient available land which allows a large depot to be constructed. After the line was opened to Lagunen, there was insufficient space at Kronstad to house additional trams. The line to the airport opened in 2017.

Plans 
Plans for the expansion northwards from the city center to Åsane involve either building the system to replace many of the local buses operating in Sandviken, or make the light rail line an express service. If the latter is chosen, the line will bypass Bryggen in a tunnel and make few stops before Åsane. An important stop mid-way is the Norwegian School of Economics. The terminus will probably be Åsane Senter or Nyborg; the former shopping center has set aside areas for a station. At Åsane, a major bus terminal would allow connections to the northern parts of Bergen, suburbs further north and areas in Nordhordland. An important political argument for prioritizing this line is to spread out the investments to all parts of the city, since the line is being financed by taxpayers and car-users throughout the city.

The third expansion runs from the city center southwards, east of the Center–Nesttun Line, serving Haukeland University Hospital. It then heads west, intersecting with the first line at Kronstad, runs through a tunnel before serving the areas of Fyllingsdalen. The line uses parts of the Norwegian National Rail Administration's right of way from the city center to Kronstad, and features a station under the hospital, which is Western Norway's largest work place. The extension to Fyllingsdalen opened on 21 November 2022.
It is not planned an extension to Loddefjord and Storavatnet from Fyllingsdalen at this time because the time of travel will be much higher than the direct bus line using the highway to the city center.
A project group with members of the Norwegian Public Roads Administration and the National Rail Administration have proposed that instead of rebuilding the Ulriken Tunnel to double track, a new double-track light rail tunnel could be built from the city center to Arna. This would allow the light rail line to replace the two-station Bergen Commuter Rail service, and give better access to the city center for people from Arna. Several politicians, including the majority in Hordaland County Council, have stated that in the long run they want the light rail line extended northwards to Knarvik and westwards to Straume and Kleppestø.

Operation
 
The building of the line is the responsibility of Bybanen Utbygging, which is an agency within Vestland County. The physical infrastructure and trams are owned by Bybanen AS, a limited company wholly owned by Vestland County. This company is responsible for maintenance of the right-of-way and the vehicles, and for extensions. Light rail operations are based on contracts granted after public tender competitions held by Skyss, a county agency that administers all public transport in Hordaland, including buses, boats and ferries. From 2010 to 2017, with the possibility for a two-year extension, the line will be operated by Keolis Norge AS. Stadler has the responsibility for maintenance of the trams for the first seven years, as part of the purchase contract.

The line is operated on a four/five-minute headway by all-stops trams, with an eight-minute headway in off-peak times and a 20 minutes headway at night. Travel time from Byparken to Lagunen is 32 minutes. In 2022, the full price of a single ticket is NOK 40.  Tickets are valid with free transfer to buses in Bergen.

Rolling stock

In 2007, the Planning Office ordered 12 Variobahn trams from Stadler Rail, with an additional four on option. The first tram arrived on 7 December 2009, and was used for testing in the months leading up to the opening. Before the opening, three more trams were in place. All stations are built for extended trams.

There is a slightly elevated driver's cab at each end. Acceleration is 1.25 m/s2 (4.13 ft/s2), and they are capable of operating on a 7.0% gradient. Current is collected via a pantograph, at 750 volts direct current. Each tram is sufficiently powerful to haul another unit in case of emergencies.

Capacity is for 212 passengers, of which 84 can sit four abreast. The entire tram is step-free, including between the cars and the platforms. Seats are designed for travel times up to 60 minutes. Stop buttons are only available at the doors; this has been chosen to speed alighting times. All stations are announced visually and orally. The trams have wireless Internet access.

All stations are announced with a short distinctive melody and the station's name. The melodies were composed by Snorre Valen, while the voice was recorded by Heidi Lambach.

Currently there are 34 Variobahn trams in operation.

Infrastructure
The line has no terminal balloon loops, so trams must be bi-directional. The current is supplied from six rectifiers, specified so the system can operate with two rectifiers out of service. In the city center the overhead wire has been designed to minimize the number of poles, while in the suburban areas a conventional system has a carrier wire above the power wire.

The line is double track, allowing visual signaling and speed adjustment on all at-grade stretches. In city streets S60 track is used; on private right-of-way, S49 track. In the tunnels, only one tram can operate in each direction; this is regulated by lights and an automatic Train Protection system. Signaling uses the German BOStrab system, not traditional Norwegian light signals. The line has traffic signal preemption, so the trams send a signal to the traffic light control when the driver starts the door-closing signal to give the tram priority at traffic lights.

The depot is at Kronstad, at a former yard used by the Norwegian State Railways, where a track that connects the light rail network to the Bergen Line. The depot was finished in 2009, and has room for 16  trams plus a workshop with space for two trams and a garage with place for three. There is sufficient area for further expansion, but tracks have not been laid. When the light rail line is expanded to Flesland, a new main depot is planned in an area with cheaper land, and Kronstad depot will be converted to a pure overnighting facility.

Stations

Fifteen stations were built for the first stage, and five for the second stage. The stations and the visual profile of the system as a whole are designed by the Bergen-based design groups Cubus and Fuggi Baggi Design, and Copenhagen-based Kontrapunkt. The stations of the first two stages are at street level, with facilities for buying tickets and dynamic displays that show when the next tram will arrive. The platforms have step-free access to the trams, allowing unhindered accessibility by wheelchairs and perambulators.

The municipal government has permitted denser development around the stations, where it wants most new housing and commercial property to be built. Development projects for Slettebakken, Wergeland, Paradis and Lagunen have been announced by private developers. Many of the stations are in primarily residential areas, and the projects have met resistance from residents who fear that the character of their neighborhoods will be altered.

References

External links

 Official site
 Pics of Bergen light rail

 
Tram transport in Bergen
Light rail in Norway
Railway lines opened in 2010
2010 establishments in Norway
Hordaland County Municipality
750 V DC railway electrification